Patrik Vojtaššák (born 26 August 1992) is a Slovak professional ice hockey player who played with HK SKP Poprad in the Slovak Extraliga during the 2010–11 season.

External links

Living people
1992 births 
HK Poprad players
Slovak ice hockey forwards
Place of birth missing (living people)